{{DISPLAYTITLE:C10H10O6}}
The molecular formula C10H10O6 (molar mass: 226.18 g/mol, exact mass: 226.0477 u) may refer to:

 Chorismic acid
 Prephenic acid

Molecular formulas